Francisco García may refer to:

Sportsmen
 Francisco García (athlete) (born 1949), Spanish Olympic sprinter
 Francisco García (basketball) (born 1981), Dominican professional basketball player who plays in the National Basketball Association
 Francisco García (rugby union) (born 1970), former Argentine rugby union player
 Francisco García (footballer, born 1988), Paraguayan forward
 Francisco García (footballer, born 1990), Salvadoran defender
 Francisco García (footballer, born 1991), Paraguayan midfielder
 Francisco García (footballer, born 1998), Argentine midfielder
 Francisco García (footballer, born 2003), Mexican forward
 Francisco García (sailor) (born 1947), Spanish Olympic sailor
 Francisco García Gómez (born 1938), Spanish international footballer and coach
 Francisco García Hernández (born 1954), Spanish footballer and coach
 Francisco García Solsona (born 1992), Spanish footballer
 Javi García (Francisco Javier García Fernández, born 1987), Spanish footballer
 Francisco Sérgio García (born 1948), Brazilian basketball player
 Francisco García Moreno (1947–2016), Mexican Olympic water polo player

Religious figures
 Francisco García de la Rosa Figueroa, Franciscan
 Francisco García Diego y Moreno (1785–1846), bishop of California

Politicians
 Francisco García Lizardi (born 1941), Mexican politician
 Francisco García Salinas (1786–1841), Mexican politician
 Francisco García Calderón (1834–1905), president of Peru
 Francisco García Cabeza de Vaca, Mexican politician

Others
 Francisco García Calderón Rey (1883–1953), Peruvian writer
 Francisco García Escalero (1948–2014), Spanish serial killer
 Francisco García Romero (1559–?), Spanish military and conquering
 Francisco García Tortosa (born 1937), Spanish professor, literary critic and translator
 Francis García (Francisco Garcia, 1958–2007), Mexican actor and designer

See also
 Fran García (disambiguation)
 Frank Garcia (disambiguation)